Double Action Daniels is a 1925 American silent Western film directed by Richard Thorpe and starring Jay Wilsey, J.P. Lockney and D'Arcy Corrigan.

Cast
 Jay Wilsey as Double Action Daniels 
 Lorna Palmar a Ruth Fuller
 Edna Hall as Mother Rose Daniels
 J.P. Lockney as Old Bill Daniels
 Edward Peil Sr. as Jack Monroe 
 D'Arcy Corrigan as Richard Booth
 N.E. Hendrix as Davis
 Lafe McKee as The Banker
 Harry Belmour as The Hotelkeeper 
 Clyde McClary as The Sheriff
 William Ryno as The Wop
 Cy Belmore as The Kid
 Sammy Thomas as Sammy

References

Bibliography
 Connelly, Robert B. The Silents: Silent Feature Films, 1910-36, Volume 40, Issue 2. December Press, 1998.
 Munden, Kenneth White. The American Film Institute Catalog of Motion Pictures Produced in the United States, Part 1. University of California Press, 1997.

External links
 

1925 films
1925 Western (genre) films
1920s English-language films
American silent feature films
Silent American Western (genre) films
American black-and-white films
Films directed by Richard Thorpe
1920s American films